Ethan Vernon (born 26 August 2000) is a British road and track cyclist, who currently rides for UCI WorldTeam .

Major results

Track

2017
 National Junior Championships
1st  Individual pursuit
1st  Points race
1st  Kilo
3rd Scratch race
 3rd Madison (with William Tidball), National Championships
2018
 National Junior Championships
1st  Individual pursuit
1st  Madison (with William Tidball)
 2nd  Individual pursuit, UCI World Junior Championships
 National Championships
2nd Madison (with Rhys Britton)
3rd Team pursuit
2019
 2nd Team pursuit, National Championships
2020
 2nd  Kilo, UEC European Championships
 National Championships
2nd Team pursuit
3rd Scratch race
2021
 3rd  Team pursuit, UCI World Championships
2022
 UCI World Championships
1st  Team pursuit
3rd  Elimination race
 2nd  Team pursuit, Commonwealth Games
2023
 2nd  Team pursuit, UEC European Championships

Road

2019
 3rd Time trial, National Under-23 Championships
2021
 1st Stage 4 Tour de l'Avenir
 7th Time trial, UCI World Under-23 Championships
 10th Trofeo Alcudia–Port d'Alcudia
2022
 Okolo Slovenska
1st Prologue & Stage 1
 1st Stage 5 Volta a Catalunya
 5th Grote Prijs Jean-Pierre Monseré
2023
 1st Trofeo Palma
 Tour du Rwanda
1st Stages 1 & 2
 2nd Trofeo Ses Salines–Alcúdia

References

External links

2000 births
Living people
British male cyclists
Welsh male cyclists
Welsh track cyclists
Sportspeople from Bedford
Cyclists at the 2018 Commonwealth Games
Commonwealth Games competitors for Wales
European Games competitors for Great Britain
Cyclists at the 2019 European Games
Olympic cyclists of Great Britain
Cyclists at the 2020 Summer Olympics
Cyclists at the 2022 Commonwealth Games
Commonwealth Games competitors for England
21st-century British people
Commonwealth Games medallists in cycling
Commonwealth Games silver medallists for England
UCI Track Cycling World Champions (men)
People educated at Bedford School
Medallists at the 2022 Commonwealth Games